The M-11 Shtorm is a Russian naval surface-to-air missile system. Its GRAU designation is 4K60. Its NATO reporting name is SA-N-3 Goblet. Unusually for such systems, it has no land-based counterpart. It was only deployed on Russian vessels, and was never used in combat.

Development

Development of the M-11 Storm system was first authorised on 25 July 1959. Work was carried out by Scientific Research Institute 10 (NII-10) that was also working on the M-1 Volna system. It was originally intended to be installed on the Project 1126 warship, but both the ship and missile system were canceled in June 1961. However, the missile project was re-activated only a month later for installation in the Project 1123 Moskva-class helicopter carrier. The design was completed in April 1962, and included a modified version of the ZIF-101 launcher, that was used with the M-1 missile system. The launcher design proved to be impractical, the resulting redesign delayed production of prototypes until 1964.

Between 1964 and 1966 sea trials were conducted on the missile testbed OS-24 which had previously been the heavy cruiser .

Description

The 4K60/41K65 missiles are carried in pairs on rotating twin rail launchers and fly at between Mach 2 and 3. Guidance is via radio command.

The radar associated with the M-11 is known as "Head Lights", often found in conjunction with a "Top Sail" search radar.

The initial version of this system, the 4K60 M-11 "Shtorm" with V611 missiles is known to the US DoD as the SA-N-3A. The upgraded version is the 4K65 "Shtorm-M" with V611M missiles and is designated the SA-N-3B.

Variants
4K60 Shtorm V611 (SA-N-3A) - Initial version
4K65 Shtorm-M V611M (SA-N-3B) - Improved version

Installations
A total of 25 systems were produced and installed on the following classes of ships:
 s (1967–1991) – two twin B-189 launchers, each fed from twin six-round drum magazines, for a total of 48 missiles.
 Kara-class guided missile cruisers (1969–2014, one in reserve until April 2020) – two B-189 twin launchers, each fed from twin six-round drum magazines, 80 missiles total.
 Kresta II-class guided missile cruisers (1968–1993) – two twin launchers. 72 missiles total.
 s (first launched 1970, last sold to India 2004) – two twin launchers.

Former operators

See also
 Mark 11 missile launcher

References

 flot.sevastopol.info (Russian) with real foto
 shooter.com.ua (Russian) with real foto
 militaryrussia.ru (Russian) with real foto
Jane's Naval Weapon Systems issue thirty three.
Naval Institute Guide To Naval Weapon Systems.

Cold War surface-to-air missiles of the Soviet Union
M-011
Naval surface-to-air missiles
M-011
Military equipment introduced in the 1960s